Frá Fornjóti ok hans ættmönnum (Old Norse for "Of Fornjót and His Kinsmen") is legendary saga consisting of a collection of three works on the foundation of Norway:

Hversu Noregr byggðist ("How Norway was inhabited")
Fundinn Noregr ("Foundation of Norway")
Af Upplendinga konungum ("Of the Kings of the Uplands")

External links
Norrøne Tekster og Kvad: Fornaldarsögur Norðurlanda
Old Norse text at Snerpa.is
English translation by George Dasent
English translation by George L. Hardman with Facing Old Norse Text
English translation by Gavin Chappell with Facing Old Norse Text

Legendary sagas